Festuca flacca is a species of grass in the family Poaceae. It is found only in Ecuador.

References

flacca
Endemic flora of Ecuador
Near threatened plants
Plants described in 1984
Taxa named by Eduard Hackel
Taxonomy articles created by Polbot